They Knew Mr. Knight is a 1934 dramatic novel by the British writer Dorothy Whipple.

Synopsis
Tom Blake, a factory worker, becomes involved with a shady financier known as Mr. Knight. Guided by Knight, Blake becomes involved in series of bad investments and fraud. He is arrested and sent to jail. On his release, Blake has to come to terms with the difficult prospect of reintegrating into society.

Critical reception
The Times Literary Supplement wrote, "the portraits in the book are fired by Mrs Whipple's article of faith - the supreme importance of people" ; while The Sunday Telegraph called the novel a "real treat."

Adaptation

The novel was adapted into a 1946 film of the same title directed by Norman Walker and starring Mervyn Johns, Joan Greenwood and Alfred Drayton.

References

External links
They Knew Mr. Knight at Persephone Books

Bibliography
 Murphy, Robert. Realism and Tinsel: Cinema and Society in Britain 1939-48. Routledge, 1992.

1934 British novels
British novels adapted into films
Novels by Dorothy Whipple
Novels set in England
Farrar & Rinehart books